Santeri Saari (born October 18, 1994) is a Finnish professional ice hockey defenceman. He is currently playing with the Gyergyói HK in the Erste Liga. Saari was selected by the St. Louis Blues in the 6th round (173rd overall) of the 2013 NHL Entry Draft.

Saari made his SM-liiga debut playing with Jokerit during the 2012–13 SM-liiga season.

Following his Liiga stints with Jokerit and HPK, Saari left the Mestis, signing with the farm team of Austrian outfit, the Vienna Capitals, of the Erste Liga on August 1, 2018.

Career statistics

Regular season and playoffs

International

References

External links

1994 births
Living people
Bofors IK players
Finnish ice hockey defencemen
HPK players
Jokerit players
Kiekko-Vantaa players
Ice hockey people from Helsinki
St. Louis Blues draft picks